KNUZ could refer to:
 1230 KCOH Houston, Texas, which was KNUZ (AM) until 1997
 1090 KULF Bellville, Texas, which was KNUZ (AM) from 1997 to 2009
 106.1 KNUZ (FM) San Saba, Texas, which was KBAL-FM from 1995 to 2009
 KNUZ-TV, a defunct DuMont-affiliated analog television station (channel 39) licensed to Houston, Texas, United States from -.